Westview High School is a public comprehensive high school located in Torrey Highlands, a community of San Diego, California in the United States.  It is part of the Poway Unified School District.

Westview uses a 4 by 4 block schedule for each school year. Under this system, the school year is divided into four quarters, as opposed to other schools' semester and trimester systems. Each student takes up to four classes per quarter, allowing a student to complete up to sixteen classes each year.

Westview is accredited by the Schools Commission of the Western Association of Schools and Colleges. Its CEEB school code is #052-986.

Administration and staff

Westview is divided into three "hubs," each with a separate administration system and cadre of homeroom teachers, designed to cultivate intraschool competition and camaraderie. The combined staff consists of 85 teachers, 4 administrators, 4 counselors, 2 librarians, 1 school psychologist, and 39 support staff.

There have been instances of inappropriate contact between staff and students. Reporting has shown inadequate policies and investigations by school and district staff in preventing such interactions.

Enrollment 
As of the 2019-2020 school year, 2,376 students were enrolled at the school. Of these students, 595 of them were enrolled in 9th grade, 581 in 10th, 602 in 11th, and 598 in 12th. The school's student body is 37.3% White, 37.9% Asian/Filipino, 10.6% Hispanic or Latino, 2.2% African American, 0.5% Pacific Islander, 0.1% Native American, and 11.6% Two or more races.

Of the 586 graduates of the school in 2011, 94% decided to attend college. Of these, 73% went to 4-year colleges and the remaining 27% to 2-year colleges.

Academics 
A 4x4 block learning schedule is implemented at Westview, meaning that over the course of a year a student will take up to eight courses, or four each semester. Each course is broken into two nine-week quarters each worth five credits, or the equivalent of a semester at most high schools that go by the semester system. In addition to the four daily classes, there are various other periods such as Homeroom, Sustained Silent Homework (SSH), and Wolverine Time, a tutorial period, which occurs on Tuesdays, Wednesdays, and Thursdays. School begins at 8:35 AM on all days except Wednesday, when it begins at 9:55 AM. School ends at 3:45 PM except on "minimum days" on final exam dates where only half the classes exist.

Graduation from Westview requires meeting PUSD's course requirements. They include a biological science course, a civics and economics course, a fine arts course, two math courses (at least one math course must be taken in each of 9th and 10th grade), a physical science course, one English course in each grade, and one course in each of U.S. history and world history. In addition to the required ninth-grade physical education requirement, one other physical education course is needed. Though not required for graduation, students must also take at least two foreign language courses in the same language in order to be able to enter a state university. In addition, all students must take at least 8.5 elective courses to graduate, which can be satisfied by completing extra courses in the subject areas above, or by completing designated elective courses. Students also need to pass the California High School Exit Exam.

Grade point averages are computed with each quarter receiving either an A, B, C, D, or F, which correspond to 4, 3, 2, 1, and 0, respectively. In addition to one Honors course, all Advanced Placement courses are assigned values of 5, 4, 3, 1, and 0, for these grades. A grade of "F" in any course means a failing grade, and as such will not qualify for graduation credits, and if the course is a required course, it must be retaken and passed in order to qualify. A grade of "D" in any course that has it will qualify for graduation credits, but will not count as having been passed for entry into state universities, and as such if a student who wishes to enter a state university after graduation earns this grade, they must retake the course and earn at least a "C". However, not all courses include a grade of D, as some only go down to C and consider anything lower as an F; in such courses, at least a C is necessary to pass the course and earn graduation credits.

Notable alumni 
Arianna Afsar, singer and actress, appeared on American Idol 8, the 2011 Miss America pageant, and in the Chicago production of the musical Hamilton
Dakota Dickerson, Class of 2015; professional race car driver in Formula 3 and Formula 4
James Holmes, Class of 2006; gunman in the 2012 Aurora, Colorado shooting
Taylor McNamara, American football tight end
Kelly Marie Tran, actress, cast as Rose Tico in Star Wars: The Last Jedi

See also
Primary and secondary schools in San Diego, California

References

External links
 

High schools in San Diego
Educational institutions established in 2002
Public high schools in California
2002 establishments in California